Best Silver, Toshiko Akiyoshi '89~'96 is a compilation album released by Nippon Crown Records.  It contains tracks taken from the first 7 Nippon Crown releases of jazz pianist Toshiko Akiyoshi in small combo settings.

Track listing
"Cleopatra's Dream" – 6:31 (from Remembering Bud)
"Summer Time" – 5:01 (from Four Seasons)
"Dig" – 7:56 (from Dig)
"Kogun" – 7:12 (from Time Stream: Toshiko Plays Toshiko)
"When You Wish Upon A Star" – 6:22 (from Night and Dream)
"Tico Tico" – 3:35 (from Yes, I Have No 4 Beat Today)
"Sophisticated Lady" – 6:00 (from Chic Lady)

Personnel
Toshiko Akiyoshi – piano
others (see individual original album listings)

References / External Links
Nippon Crown CRCJ-9143

1997 compilation albums
Toshiko Akiyoshi compilation albums